Oliva miniacea, common name the Pacific common olive, is a species of sea snail, a marine gastropod mollusk in the family Olividae, the olives.

There are two subspecies:
 Oliva miniacea berti Terzer, 1986: synonym of Oliva efasciata berti (Terzer, 1986)
 Oliva miniacea miniacea (Röding, 1798): synonym of Miniaceoliva miniacea (Röding, 1798) synonym of Oliva miniacea (Röding, 1798) 
 Oliva miniacea tremulina Lamarck, 1811: synonym of Oliva tremulina (Lamarck, 1811)

Description
The length of the shell varies between 45 mm and 100mm. It is one of the larger olive snails.

As is typical of olivids, the shell of this species is smooth, glossy, and elongated, with a very long aperture. The spire of this species is quite low even for an olivid. The filament channel, a groove present on the spire of olivids, is especially distinct in this species.

Shells of this species tend to have a yellowish or pale orange ground color with a pattern of two or three wide, rough bands of a much darker color (usually dark brown or black). Finer patterning is often present between the bands. Exceedingly pale specimens may be off-white with light brown patterns. At the opposite extreme, sometimes the pattern can cover so much of the shell that the shell is nearly black. The inside of the aperture is orange or yellowish-orange.

This species has caused food poisoning with a paralytic toxin in Taiwan in 2002.

Distribution
This species occurs in the Indian Ocean off Chagos, the Mascarene Basin and Mauritius; in the Western Pacific Ocean and in the Andaman Sea.

References

 Dautzenberg, Ph. (1929). Mollusques testacés marins de Madagascar. Faune des Colonies Francaises, Tome III 
 Sargent D.M. & Petuch E.J. (2012) A new species of Oliva (Gastropoda: Olividae) from Mauritius, Mascarene Islands. Visaya 3(5): 4–10.
 Liu, J.Y. [Ruiyu] (ed.). (2008). Checklist of marine biota of China seas. China Science Press. 1267 pp.
 Petuch, E. J.; Myers, R. F. (2014). New species and subspecies of olive shells (Gastropoda: Olividae) from the Panamic and Indo-Pacific regions and the Gulf of Mexico. The Festivus. 46(3): 63–74

External links

 Röding, P.F. (1798). Museum Boltenianum sive Catalogus cimeliorum e tribus regnis naturæ quæ olim collegerat Joa. Fried Bolten, M. D. p. d. per XL. annos proto physicus Hamburgensis. Pars secunda continens Conchylia sive Testacea univalvia, bivalvia & multivalvia. Trapp, Hamburg. viii, 199 pp.
 Duclos, P. L. (1835-1840). Histoire naturelle générale et particulière de tous les genres de coquilles univalves marines a l'état vivant et fossile publiée par monographie. Genre Olive. Paris: Institut de France. 33 plates
 Ducros de Saint Germain A. M. P. (1857). Revue critique du genre Oliva de Bruguières. 120 pp
 
  Oliva miniacea miniacea (Röding, 1798)

miniacea
Gastropods described in 1798